The Street of Forgotten Men is a 1925 American silent crime melodrama film directed by Herbert Brenon and released by Paramount Pictures. The film features the debut of actress Louise Brooks in an uncredited role.

Plot
As described in a film magazine reviews, Portland Fancy, a bowery woman, dies, leaving her daughter of four in the care of Easy Money Charlie, a beggar who fakes a stump arm on the streets of New York City. True to his promise, Charlie rears the girl away from the bowery in beautiful environment, never confessing his faking method of earning a living. A beautiful young woman, she grows up to become engaged to a young attorney who is in a smart social set. Charlie tells Peyton, her fiancé, what a grafter he is and then departs for Australia. The young woman is married to Peyton on a night shortly after the secret return of Charlie, who is now thought dead. Charlie returns to his only way of livelihood after he has thrashed White Eye for trying to blackmail Peyton.

Cast

Production

Filming
Production began on April 6 and finished around June 6th. The film was shot at Paramount’s Astoria Studios in Astoria, Queens. Location shooting was done elsewhere on Long Island as well as on the streets of Manhattan, including on Fifth Avenue and at the landmark Little Church Around the Corner.

Preservation
The Library of Congress has an incomplete print of the film, consisting of six of the seven reels. The reel which does not survive is the second reel of the film, which includes the deaths of two characters, Portland Fancy, and the dog taken care of by Easy Money Charlie. In March 2022, the San Francisco Silent Film Festival announced a major restoration of the film.

References

External links

The Street of Forgotten Men filmography page at Louise Brooks Society
The Street of Forgotten Men at silentera.com
Stills at silenthollywood.com

1925 films
Paramount Pictures films
American silent feature films
American crime drama films
American black-and-white films
1925 crime drama films
1920s American films
Films with screenplays by John Russell (screenwriter)
Melodrama films
Films set in New York City
Films shot at Astoria Studios
Silent American drama films